Anthony Hooper may refer to:

Sir Anthony Robin Maurice Hooper (1918–1987), of the Hooper baronets
Tony Hooper (1943–2020), English singer-songwriter
Anthony Hooper (judge) (born 1937), member of the British Privy Council